Hyperion Press was an American publishing company, based in Westport, Connecticut. In the 1970s, it published science fiction and science fiction studies including reissues of several books first published by World Publ. Co. of Cleveland and classic comics and mathematics. It published two different series. The first was in 1974. The second was in 1976.
 

It is not related to the Disney publisher established 1990 or its 21st-century descendant Hachette and Disney imprints Hyperion Books, Hyperion Books for Children.

References 
1.

Year of establishment missing
Book publishing companies based in Connecticut
Companies based in Westport, Connecticut
Defunct book publishing companies of the United States
Publishing companies established in the 20th century